Ashraf Gurukkal is a Kalari Gurukkal, stunt and action choreographer. He was born in Eriyad, near Kodungallur in the Indian state of Kerala. He began working as a Kalari trainer in the region in 1989. His debut came in the typical Kalari choreography in the Kamal directed blockbuster title, Peruvannapurathe Visheshangal. He continues in the fields as a stunt choreographer, production executive, production controller, actor in TV serials, as well as Mollywood.

References

മഞ്ജു വാര്യരെയും ഗാംഗുലിയെയും കളരി പഠിപ്പിച്ചു; ഇപ്പോൾ അടവ് ക്യാന്‍സറിനോട്

External links
 
Profile of Malayalam Actor Ashraf Gurukkal
Ashraf Gurukkal

Year of birth missing (living people)
Living people
21st-century Indian male actors
Indian action choreographers
Kalarippayattu
Male actors in Malayalam cinema
Male actors from Kerala